Roose is a surname, and may refer to:

Betty Roose (1778–1808), German actress
Caesar Roose (1886–1967) New Zealand ship owner
Caroline Roose (born 1968), Belgian-born French politician 
Kevin Roose, author and business columnist for the New York Times
Leigh Richmond Roose (1877–1916), Welsh footballer
Richard Roose (died 1531), English cook convicted of attempted poisoning
Thorkild Roose (1874–1961), Danish actor and theatre director